Dan Koeppel (born 1962) is an American author and columnist.  He has written columns for The New York Times Magazine and Popular Science, as well as having written extensively in a variety of mountain biking periodicals. He was previously the editor of the magazine Mountain Bike leaving the magazine in 1996.  However, he still contributes a column titled 'Hug the Bunny' to the magazine.  He was inducted into the Mountain Bike Hall of Fame in 2003 for his journalism work.  He is a former commentator for the business and radio program Marketplace, and has a writing credit for the Star Trek: The Next Generation episode "Inheritance". Dan organizes the two-day event known as bigparadeLA.  It is a public walk starting at Downtown Los Angeles' Angels Flight, ends at the Hollywood Sign, above Hollywood and covers 35 miles and 101 sets of public stairways.
He is perhaps best known for his first book, To See Every Bird on Earth, touted as his attempt to understand his father's obsession with listing birds.  His second book, Banana: The Fate of the Fruit That Changed the World, was released in December 2007.

Books and articles
Robert Meyer and Dan Koeppel. Every Minute Is a Day: A Doctor, an Emergency Room, and a City Under Siege. New York: Crown. 2021. 
Dan Koeppel, Banana: The Fate of the Fruit that Changed the World, 
Dan Koeppel, The New York Times article of June 18, 2008, "Yes, We Will Have No Bananas"

References

External links

Publisher's Official page
Video Interview of the author
Interview of the author by USA Today over To See Every Bird on Earth

American columnists
American non-fiction writers
1962 births
Living people
Mountain biking journalists